The Notorious Mrs. Carrick is a 1924 British silent crime film directed by George Ridgwell and starring Cameron Carr, A.B. Imeson and Gordon Hopkirk. It was an adaptation of the novel Pools of the Past by Charles Proctor. The film was made by Britain's largest film company of the era Stoll Pictures.

Cast
 Cameron Carr as David Carrick
 A.B. Imeson as Tony Tregarthen
 Gordon Hopkirk as Gerald Rosario
 Sydney Folker as David Arman
 Jack Denton as Allen Richards
 Disa as Sybil Tregarthen
 Peggy Lynn as Honor Tregarthen
 Basil Saunders as Inspector Samson
 Arthur Lumley as Owen Lawson

References

External links

1924 films
British crime films
1920s English-language films
Films based on British novels
Films directed by George Ridgwell
Stoll Pictures films
British black-and-white films
British silent feature films
Films shot at Cricklewood Studios
1924 crime films
1920s British films